Anton Fischer may refer to:

Anton Fischer (bobsleigh), bobsledder who competed for West Germany in the 1980s
Anton Hubert Fischer (1840–1912), German archbishop
 Anton Otto Fischer (1882–1962), illustrator for the Saturday Evening Post